A lamba is the traditional garment worn by  men and women that live in  Madagascar. The textile, highly emblematic of Malagasy culture, consists of a rectangular length of cloth wrapped around the body.

Traditional lambas used for burial were often made of silk and cow hides while those for daily wear were more often made of raffia, pig skin, cotton or bast. They could range in color from a tie-dyed mess or solid white cloth, to striped red, white and black cloth found in most parts of the island, the geometric patterns in unique shades of green and brown produced by a handful of Sakalava villages, or the brilliantly multi-colored, complex weaves favored by the pre-colonial Merina aristocracy. Today, it is common to find printed cotton or rayon lambas produced in India for the Malagasy market in addition to those fabricated locally.

Besides its daily use as basic clothing, the lamba is also used for tying children to mothers' backs or as a cushion when carrying a heavy object on top of the head. The lamba is also used ritually to wrap the remains of the dead before placing them in the family tomb. Which after the ceremony are then 
placed on the dead for an order of respect to their souls.

In Malagasy culture

The term lamba is the name in the Highlands dialect of the woven cloth that traditionally formed the essential article of clothing throughout Madagascar.  This garment is known by other words in various regions where other dialects are spoken; in some parts of the east, for instance, the garment is known by the word simbo.  Many of the ways in which the cloth may be wrapped around the wearer are specified by a wide variety of terms that vary from region to region. The color, print and type of cloth varies from region to region.  The largest lambas (lambamena) are made of a heavy white silk and are used to wrap the bodies of the deceased before placing them in the family tomb.  Among some ethnic groups, lambas were also traditionally exchanged between a man and woman as part of their engagement ceremony, or as diplomatic gifts, as demonstrated by the two detailed silk lamba akotofahana (one multicolored, the other white-on-white) given in 1886 to President Grover Cleveland by Queen Ranavalona III on display at the Smithsonian National Museum of African Art.

Types

There are numerous types of lambas produced in Madagascar. The names can serve to distinguish the material used, pattern type, ritual purpose of the garment or the intended wearer. Names of lambas vary from one region to the next according to local dialects, so the list below is not exhaustive but rather representative of some of the most commonly distinguishable types of lamba. It is many types in Madagascar

Lambahoany

A printed cotton lamba typically featuring a proverb on the lower border of the design, identical to the kangas worn throughout eastern Africa.  The lambahoany is presently the most commonly worn type of lamba.  These are traditionally made of printed cotton featuring a repeated border design that encloses either a secondary pattern (often around a central medallion) or a large image depicting a pastoral scene from daily life.  A popular proverb, or ohabolana, is typically written just above the center of the lower border. 
The uses of the ubiquitous lambahoany are numerous and varied.  They are often wrapped to attach an infant to its mother's back, freeing her hands for other uses.  They may also serve as light blankets, sheets, an apron, a transport sack, a tablecloth or a sunshade, and when tightly coiled they can be used as a cushion when carrying heavy objects on top of the head.

Lamba akotofahana
A woven silk lamba featuring highly complex geometric designs.

Lamba mpanjaka
A ceremonial lamba traditionally worn by nobles, the wealthy, or elders.

Lambamena

A silk burial shroud.

Lamba arindrano
A traditional lamba made of a blend of silk and cotton.

Jabo-landy
A traditional lamba made of a blend of silk and raffia fibers.

Laimasaka
A traditional Sakalava raffia lamba commonly decorated with geometric ikat-dyed patterns and often used as a burial shroud.
It is still a tradition in Madagascar..

Salaka
A lamba worn as a loincloth, measuring about 30 cm wide and 300 cm long.

Modes of use

The style of wearing the lamba likewise varies between regions and according to the gender of the wearer.  Both sexes will wrap it around the waist, much like a sarong.  Women will also wear it wrapped over or beneath the bust to form a sheath dress, often with matching lamba headdress.  These styles can be paired with a tank top or other light shirt.

Men may drape the lamba over one shoulder as a shawl over shorts or – in cooler weather – over a malabary,  a long-sleeved, knee-length cotton tunic.  Traditionally, the lamba is draped over the left shoulder but is draped over the right when in mourning.  Among mature Merina and (to a lesser extent) Betsileo women, wearing a narrower version of the traditionally white lamba around the shoulders is a mark of "elegance, dignity, femininity and respect for tradition."

Narrow lambas may be worn like a sash.  Men drape them diagonally across the chest or knot them around the waist, while women may wear them loosely over the shoulders.  The sash-like fashion was popularized due to European influence and is especially typical of the costume of hiragasy dancers.

Production
Traditional lambas were most often woven on horizontal ground looms, the most common type of loom found in Madagascar. The weaver was most often a woman and would be seated to one side of the loom as she worked the threads. For many women, weaving formed a basic domestic responsibility required to produce clothing for family members. Surplus could be sold to supplement family income; this occurred most often among the Merina and Betsileo of the Highlands.

As art

The lamba akotofahana, the highly colorful lamba weaving style associated with the Merina aristocracy, consisted of complex geometric designs created by the uniquely Merina practice of using extra heddles across the loom to create raised bands of pattern.  This striking statement of andriana class distinction in the imperial era was preserved in a toned-down form under colonial rule: the same intricate patterns were retained but the designs were woven in white-on-white to draw less attention to the statement of class and ethnic identity they made.

In recent years, the interest in (and demand for) traditional, highly colored lamba akotofahana has increased among well-to-do Malagasy expatriates, tourists and textile aficionados, which has led to a resurgence in their production and sale in fine art galleries in Antananarivo.  Contemporary artists have turned their attention to the resurrection of these ancient, half-forgotten techniques, producing unique works of art featured in exhibitions at internationally renowned museums.  At the American Museum of Natural History, for instance, a lamba akotofahana was displayed that had been woven entirely from the silk threads produced by the female golden orb-weaver spider. A lamba akotofahana exhibiting the full range of colors and detailed patterns of the shawls worn by pre-colonial nobles, woven by artist Martin Rakotoarimanana, has likewise been recently displayed at the Metropolitan Museum of Art.

See also
Malagasy weaving
Feather cloak

Notes

External links
 Lamba Gallery 1
 Lamba Gallery 2

Malagasy culture
African clothing
African art
Textile arts of Africa
Malagasy words and phrases
Textile arts of Madagascar